Lombard is a station on Metra's Union Pacific West Line, located in Lombard, Illinois. The station is located at 9 South Main Street. Unless otherwise announced, inbound trains use the north platform and outbound trains use the south platform. The middle track does not have platform access.

As of December 5, 2022, Lombard is served by 54 trains (27 in each direction) on weekdays, by all 10 trains in each direction on Saturdays, and by all nine trains in each direction on Sundays and holidays.

Lombard station is located above ground level and consists of two side platforms. Three tracks run between the platforms, though one does not access the station. There is a station house next to the inbound (north) track, which is open from 5:00 A.M. to 1:00 P.M. Tickets are available at the station house on weekdays. Eight commuter parking lots operated by the City of Lombard are near the station; three of the lots require quarterly permits, and the other five require a daily fee of $1.25.

On June 3, 2015, a pedestrian tunnel connecting the two platforms went into service after the morning rush. This tunnel replaced the existing track-level crossing between platforms for increased pedestrian and commuter safety.

The station is in the heart of the village's central business district. Lilacia Park, the Helen Plum Library, and various local establishments are within walking distance from the station.

References

External links
 
Main Street entrance from Google Maps Street View

Metra stations in Illinois
Former Chicago and North Western Railway stations
Lombard, Illinois
Railway stations in DuPage County, Illinois
Railway stations in the United States opened in 1979
Union Pacific West Line